The 2008 British Academy Television Awards were held on 20 April at the London Palladium Theatre in London. The ceremony was broadcast live on BBC One in the United Kingdom. The nominations were announced on 18 March 2008. Drama Cranford received the most nominations with four, making Judi Dench the most nominated actress in BAFTA history for her work on TV and film combined. Long-running soap opera Coronation Street failed to earn a nomination. Bruce Forsyth received the Academy Fellowship Award.

Winners in bold.

Nominations
Best Actor
Andrew Garfield — Boy A  (Channel 4)
Tom Hardy — Stuart: A Life Backwards (BBC Two)
Matthew Macfadyen — Secret Life (Channel 4)
Antony Sher — Primo (BBC Four)
Best Actress
Eileen Atkins — Cranford (BBC One)
Judi Dench — Cranford (BBC One)
Gina McKee — The Street (BBC One)
Kierston Wareing — It's a Free World... (Channel 4)
Best Entertainment performance
Simon Amstell — Never Mind the Buzzcocks (BBC Two)
Alan Carr and Justin Lee Collins — The Friday Night Project (Channel 4)
Stephen Fry — QI (BBC Two)
Harry Hill — Harry Hill's TV Burp (ITV)
Best comedy performance
Peter Capaldi — The Thick of It (BBC Four)
James Corden — Gavin & Stacey (BBC Three)
Stephen Merchant — Extras Christmas special (BBC One)
David Mitchell — Peep Show (Channel 4)
Best single drama
Boy A (Channel 4)
Coming Down the Mountain (BBC One)
The Mark of Cain (Channel 4)
The Trial of Tony Blair (More4)
Best drama serial
Britz (Channel 4)
Cranford (BBC One)
Five Days (BBC One)
Murphy's Law (BBC One)
Best drama series
Life on Mars (BBC One)
Rome (BBC Two)
Skins (E4)
The Street (BBC One)
Best continuing drama
The Bill (ITV)
EastEnders (BBC One)
Emmerdale (ITV)
Holby City (BBC One)
Best factual series
Meet the Natives (Channel 4)
Paul Merton in China (Five)
Tribe (BBC Two)
The Tower: A Tale of Two Cities (BBC One)
Best entertainment programme
Britain's Got Talent (ITV)
Harry Hill's TV Burp (ITV)
Have I Got News for You (BBC One)
Strictly Come Dancing (BBC One)
Best situation comedy
Benidorm (ITV)
The IT Crowd (Channel 4)
Peep Show (Channel 4)
The Thick of It (BBC Four)
Best comedy programme
The Armstrong and Miller Show (BBC One)
Fonejacker (Channel 4)
Russell Brand's Ponderland (Channel 4)
Star Stories (Channel 4)
Audience award
The Apprentice (BBC Two)
Andrew Marr's History of Modern Britain (BBC Two)
Britain's Got Talent (ITV)
Cranford (BBC One)
Gavin & Stacey (BBC Three)
Strictly Come Dancing (BBC One)
Best single documentary
Beautiful Young Minds (BBC Two)
Lie of the Land (Channel 4)
Malcolm and Barbara: Love's Farewell (ITV)
Parallel Worlds, Parallel Lives (BBC Four)
Best feature
Heston Blumenthal: In Search of Perfection (BBC Two)
Ramsay's Kitchen Nightmares (Channel 4)The Secret Millionaire (Channel 4)
Top Gear (BBC Two)Best international showCalifornication (Five)
Family Guy (BBC Three)Heroes (BBC Two)
My Name Is Earl (Channel 4)
Best special factual
Andrew Marr's History of Modern Britain (BBC Two)
Earth: The Power of the Planet (BBC Two)
The Genius of Photography (BBC Four)
The Relief of Belsen (Channel 4)
Best current affairs
China's Stolen Children — A Dispatches Special (Channel 4)
Dispatches — Fighting The Taliban (Channel 4)
Honour Kills (BBC Three)
Panorama: Dog Fighting Undercover (BBC One)Best news coverageBBC Ten O'Clock News: War in Afghanistan (BBC One)
Channel 4 News: Iraq — The Surge (Channel 4)
ITV Evening News: Zimbabwe — The Tyranny and the Tragedy (ITV)Sky News — Glasgow Airport Attack (Sky News)
Best sport
The Boat Race (ITV)
ITV F1: 2007 Canadian Grand Prix Live (ITV)
2007 Rugby World Cup: England v France semi-final (ITV)
Wimbledon — The Men's Final (BBC One)
Best interactivity
Big Art Mob (Channel 4)
Doctor Who Comic Maker (BBC One)
Spooks Interactive (BBC One)
The X Factor (ITV)
Special Award
Paul Watson
BAFTA Fellowship
Bruce Forsyth

References

External links
BAFTA Television Awards Official Site
BAFTA Television Award Winners 2008

2008 awards in the United Kingdom
Television 2008
2008 television awards
2008 in British television
April 2008 events in the United Kingdom